Banya is a rural locality in the Sunshine Coast Region, Queensland, Australia.

History 
Banya is situated in the Gubbi Gubbi (Kabi) traditional Aboriginal country.  The name Banya means bunya nut in the Gubbi Gubbi and Butchulla (Badtjala) languages.

On 14 June 2019 parts of the localities of Bells Creek and Meridan Plains were excised to create the localities of Banya, Corbould Park, Gagalba and Nirimba to accommodate future suburban growth in the Caloundra South Priority Development Area.

The Stockland developed estate will house more than 800 families, a primary school and child care centre with future developments of the CAMCOS Rail Corridor.

References 

Suburbs of the Sunshine Coast Region
Localities in Queensland